John Christian Warner (May 28, 1897 – April 12, 1989), known best as Jake Warner, was an American chemist who served as the fourth President of Carnegie Mellon University in Pittsburgh, Pennsylvania, United States.

Early life
He was born in Goshen, Indiana to a farming family. He received his B.A. (1919), M.A. (1920), and Ph.D. (1923) all from the Indiana University, then worked as a research chemist for three Indiana companies. He took a teaching position at Carnegie Institute of Technology, today's Carnegie Mellon, in 1926.

Carnegie Tech years
Warner became department chair in 1938 and dean of graduate studies in 1945. In 1950 he became the university's fourth president. During his tenure, the graduate business school, named the Graduate School of Industrial Administration, was established in 1949. The first computer on campus—an IBM 650 digital type machine—was housed there in 1956. Also Hunt Library, including the Hunt Institute for Botanical Documentation, opened and the Scaife Hall of Engineering was completed. Warner acquired funding to support the development of Tech's Computation Center, the beginnings of Carnegie Mellon's leadership in the field of computer science.

Throughout his administrative career he remained active in his academic field. He authored more than 80 published works on scientific subjects as well as on secondary and higher education. During World War II, he headed government research on plutonium for the Manhattan Project.

Warner died in 1989 at age 91.  Warner Hall, the main administrative building at Carnegie Mellon, was named after John Warner.

References

Presidents of Carnegie Mellon University
20th-century American chemists
1897 births
1989 deaths
Indiana University alumni
Carnegie Mellon University faculty
Manhattan Project people
Presidents of the Electrochemical Society